Nina Carolyn Paley (born May 3, 1968) is an American cartoonist, animator, and free culture activist. She was the artist and often the writer of the comic strips Nina's Adventures and Fluff, after which she worked primarily in animation. She is perhaps best known for creating the 2008 animated feature film Sita Sings the Blues, based on the Ramayana, with parallels to her personal life. In 2018, she completed her second animated feature, Seder-Masochism, a retelling of the Book of Exodus as patriarchy emerging from goddess worship.

Paley distributes much of her work, including Nina’s Adventures, Fluff, and all the original work in Sita Sings The Blues, under a copyleft license.

Early life 
Paley was born in Urbana, Illinois, the daughter of Jean (Passovoy) and Hiram Paley. Her family was Jewish. Her father was a mathematics professor at the University of Illinois and was mayor of Urbana for a term in the early 1970s.

She attended local elementary and high schools, graduating from University High School in 1986. She illustrated a "History of the North Pole" comic in collaboration with University High School history teacher Chris Butler, and attended the University of Illinois, studying art for two years before dropping out. While in college, her comic "Joyride" ran in The Daily Illini newspaper.

Nina's Adventures and other work 

In 1988, Paley moved to Santa Cruz, California, and began to write and draw the strip Nina's Adventures. In 1991, she illustrated The Santa Cruz Haggadah and moved to San Francisco.

In 2002, she wrote and directed Fetch!, a humorous short cartoon feature based on a variety of optical illusions, which has enjoyed popularity ever since.

Beginning in 2002, Paley focused her work on the controversial subject of population growth. The most notable entry she produced on this subject was The Stork, in which the natural environment is bombed to destruction by storks dropping bundled babies. The film is a compact expression of the conflict between the increasing human population and the ecosystem in which it must live. The 3½ minute film was a considerable success at festivals and resulted in an invitation to the Sundance Film Festival.

During this period of this time, Paley also contributed several comic strips for the Voluntary Human Extinction Movement, of which she is a member and occasional spokesperson. Her work for the group still remains on their official website.

In 2012, Paley posted an animation to Vimeo titled This Land Is Mine depicting the Middle East conflicts over history; it was named a Staff Pick.

Between projects, Paley has worked as a freelance director at Duck Studios in Los Angeles. She has also taught in the Design and Technology section of Parsons, part of The New School.

Apocalypse Animated
In February 2022, Paley completed her project Apocalypse Animated, an animation of each chapter of the Book of Revelation.

Feature films 
As of 2018, Paley has created two animated feature films.

Sita Sings the Blues

In 2002, Paley moved to Trivandrum, India, where her husband had taken a job. While she was visiting New York City on business concerning her third comic strip, The Hots, her husband terminated their marriage. Unable to return to either Trivandrum or San Francisco, she moved to Brooklyn, New York.  Her personal crisis caused her to see more deeply into the Ramayana, the Indian epic, which she had encountered in India, and motivated her to produce a short animation which combines an episode from the Ramayana with a torch song recorded in 1929 by Annette Hanshaw, "Mean To Me". Paley later added episodes and other material to the work, which is now called Sita Sings the Blues. Many of the episodes appeared in animation festivals. She expanded it into a feature-length treatment of the Ramayana focused on Rama's wife, Sita, using a variety of animation styles and techniques.

The finished work premiered at the Berlin International Film Festival on February 11, 2008 and had its North American premiere at the Tribeca Film Festival on April 25, 2008. The film was screened at more than 150 film festivals globally and was broadcast on PBS in New York City. For her work on Sita Sings the Blues, Paley was nominated for an Independent Spirit Award and garnered more than 35 international awards, including the top award at Annecy in 2008.  The New York Times review of Sita described it as "ambitious and visually loaded" and the film was named a NYT Critic's Pick.

Seder-Masochism

In 2011 she began work on a project called Seder-Masochism, an animated film about The Exodus, showing the rise of patriarchy and the fall of goddess worship. Early support was obtained for the project through a crowd-funding campaign on Kickstarter. In June 2018, after she had worked sporadically on the film for six years, Seder-Masochism premiered at the Annecy International Animated Film Festival in France. Reviewers compared Paley's style to Monty Python, and praised the film's irreverent humor. In Poland, the film was screened at the ANIMATOR film festival where it was chosen by the audience as the festival's best feature-length animated film.

Prior to the theatrical release of the film, Paley uploaded selected scenes for viewing on YouTube and Vimeo. The scene "This Land Is Mine" was first posted in 2012, and by 2014 had received 10 million views.

Free culture activism 

Because of obstacles in clearing the rights to Hanshaw's recordings for the Sita Sings the Blues, Paley took active part in the free culture movement.

Since 2009 she is an artist-in-residence at the non-profit organization QuestionCopyright.org, which includes running the projects "Minute Memes" and the "Sita Distribution Project". "Minute Memes" is a series of short ("one-minute") video "memes" made by Paley about copyright restrictions and artistic freedom. She wrote and performed the song "Copying Isn't Theft" meant to be freely remixed by other people, with the animated clip issued as Minute Meme #1. Subsequent animations in this series are "All Creative Work Is Derivative", EFF Tribute and "Credit is Due: The Attribution Song". She also wrote "Understanding Free Content", an illustrated guide to the idea of free content.

In 2010 she started a new comic strip Mimi & Eunice, highlighting intellectual property problems and paradoxes.

She has published much of her work, including Nina’s Adventures, Fluff, and all original work in Sita Sings The Blues, under a copyleft licence. The website for Sita Sings the Blues includes a wiki where its fans contributed translated subtitles for the DVD of the film.

Paley won a Public Knowledge IP3 award in 2010 "for her work in intellectual property".

Views on gender 
Paley describes herself as gender critical and writes often about the topic on her blog and social media. A showing of Seder-Masochism in 2019 was protested by trans rights activists in Champaign, Illinois due to her online comments. She was a signatory to an open letter published by The Sunday Times defending J. K. Rowling against criticism for alleged transphobia. In an interview with Feminist Current, she stated that when referencing transgender people, she does not necessarily use the pronouns that the person uses. She said, "If a man uses 'she' pronouns... I'm adamant that he is free to identify as he wants. But we're also all free to identify things how we perceive them."
Paley is a frequent contributor to a gender critical podcast, "Heterodorx".

Personal life
Though of Jewish ancestry, Paley is an atheist as was her father.

Paley identifies as childfree.

In 2011, Paley began making art quilts. The first public exhibition of her quilts was held in June 2013 in central Illinois.

Works

Comic strips 
 Nina's Adventures 
 Fluff
 the Hots
 Mimi & Eunice

Filmography 
Shorts
 Cancer (1998. Drawing directly on film. 2 minutes. Color. 35mm.)
 Luv Is... (1998. Clay animation. 3.5 minutes. Beta SP / Super-8. Color.)
 I (heart) My Cat (1998. Clay animation. 3 minutes. 16mm. Color.)
 Pandorama (2000. Drawing directly on film. 3 minutes. color. 15perf/70mm - also known as "IMAX")
 Fetch!  (2001. 2-D computer animation. 4.5 minutes. 35mm. Color.)
 Thank You for Not Breeding (2002. Documentary. 36 minutes. Video. Color.)
 The Stork (2002. 2-D computer animation (Flash/Photoshop/Final Cut Pro). 3 minutes.  Video. Color.)
 Goddess of Fertility (2002. 2-D digital animation. 2 minutes. Clay animated on a glass.  Color. 35mm.)
 Fertco  (2002. 2-D digital animation. 3 minutes. Color. Video.)
 The Wit and Wisdom of Cancer (2002. 2-D digital animation. 4.5 minutes. Color. Dialog. Video.)
 On Children, a segment in Kahlil Gibran's The Prophet (2015. 2-D digital animation. Color.)

Features
 Sita Sings the Blues (82 min, 2003–2008, 2-D digital animation. Color.)
 Seder-Masochism (2018)

Media appearances 
 The Tom and Doug Show - Paley has been a regular guest on the nationally syndicated Tom and Doug radio show, a weekly comedy music show on the Pacifica Radio Network.  She "showed" her film The Wit and Wisdom of Cancer on show 304, discussed her "Christmas Resistance movement" on show 336, discussed Tom and Doug's songs "Gangsta Knitter" and "Sooner or Later" on show 232, discussed Sita Sings the Blues on show 361, and Tom and Doug rewrote her song "Copying is Not Theft" and played it for her on show 377.

References

External links

 
 
 

1968 births
American animators
Jewish American atheists
American comic strip cartoonists
American feminists
Radical feminists
Living people
Open content activists
People from Urbana, Illinois
University Laboratory High School (Urbana, Illinois) alumni
American female comics artists
Female comics writers
20th-century American Jews
Jewish feminists
American women animators
Jewish caricaturists
American women film directors
American animated film directors
Anti-natalists
Film directors from Illinois
Critics of Judaism
Articles containing video clips
Secular Jews
Activists from Illinois
Jewish American activists
Childfree
Feminism and transgender
21st-century American Jews
American quilters